The Indian Plate (or India Plate) is a minor tectonic plate straddling the equator in the Eastern Hemisphere. Originally a part of the ancient continent of Gondwana, the Indian Plate broke away from the other fragments of Gondwana , began moving north and carried Insular India with it. It was once fused with the adjacent Australian Plate to form a single Indo-Australian Plate, and recent studies suggest that India and Australia have been separate plates for at least 3 million years and likely longer. The Indian Plate includes most of modern South Asia (the Indian subcontinent) and a portion of the basin under the Indian Ocean, including parts of South China and western Indonesia, and extending up to but not including Ladakh, Kohistan and Balochistan.

Plate movements

Gondwana broke up as these continents drifted apart at different velocities, a process which led to the opening of the Indian Ocean.

In 2012, paleomagnetic data from the Greater Himalaya was used to propose two collisions to reconcile the discrepancy between the amount of crustal shortening in the Himalaya (~) and the amount of convergence between India and Asia (~). These authors propose a continental fragment of northern Gondwana rifted from India, traveled northward, and initiated the "soft collision" between the Greater Himalaya and Asia at ~50 Mya. This was followed by the "hard collision" between India and Asia occurred at ~25 Mya. Subduction of the resulting ocean basin that formed between the Greater Himalayan fragment and India explains the apparent discrepancy between the crustal shortening estimates in the Himalaya and paleomagnetic data from India and Asia. However, the proposed ocean basin was not constrained by paleomagnetic data from the key time interval of ~120 Mya to ~60 Mya. New paleomagnetic results of this critical time interval from southern Tibet do not support this Greater Indian Ocean basin hypothesis and the associated dual collision model.

In 2007, German geologists suggested the reason the Indian Plate moved so quickly is that it is only half as thick as the other plates which formerly constituted Gondwana. The mantle plume that once broke up Gondwana might also have melted the lower part of the Indian subcontinent, which allowed it to move both more quickly and farther than the other parts. The remains of this plume today form the Marion Hotspot (Prince Edward Islands), the Kerguelen hotspot, and the Réunion hotspots. As India moved north, it is possible the thickness of the Indian Plate degenerated further as it passed over the hotspots and magmatic extrusions associated with the Deccan and Rajmahal Traps. The massive amounts of volcanic gases released during the passage of the Indian Plate over the hotspots have been theorised to have played a role in the Cretaceous–Paleogene extinction event, generally held to be due to a large asteroid impact.

In 2020, however, geologists at the University of Oxford and the Alfred Wegener Institute found that new plate-motion models displayed increased movement speeds in all mid-ocean ridges during the late Cretaceous, a result irreconcilable to current theories of plate tectonics and a refutation of the plume-push hypothesis. Pérez-Díaz concludes that the accelerated movement of the Indian Plate is an illusion wrought by large errors in geomagnetic reversal timing around the Cretaceous–Paleogene boundary, and that a recalibration of the time scale shows no such acceleration exists.

The collision with the Eurasian Plate along the boundary between India and Nepal formed the orogenic belt that created the Tibetan Plateau and the Himalaya Mountains, as sediment bunched up like earth before a plow.

Geography
The westerly side of the Indian Plate is a transform boundary with the Arabian Plate called the Owen Fracture Zone, and a divergent boundary with the African Plate called the Central Indian Ridge (CIR). The northerly side of the Plate is a convergent boundary with the Eurasian Plate forming the Himalaya and Hindu Kush mountains, called the Main Himalayan Thrust.

See also

Historical geology
List of tectonic plate interactions
List of tectonic plates
Palaeogeography
Seychelles Microcontinent

Notes

References

External links 

Geology of India
Geology of Pakistan
Geology of the Indian Ocean
Tectonic plates